Charlie Allan (born 9 July 1958, Aberdeen) is a Scottish sports editor and author. He was the editor of the Aberdeen Evening Express and main sports writer for the newspaper.

Career 
Allan has worked for the Evening Express since 1990 and was named British Telecom Scottish Sports Writer of the year in 1999. He reported on the 1998 World Cup finals and 1992 and 1996 European Championship finals. He retired in 2018.

Allan is a volunteer at Aberdeen charity, Grampian Hospital Radio, where he presents the breakfast show each weekday. In 2017 at the age of 57 Allan retired as a writer for the Evening Express.'

Personal life 
Allan is a supporter of Aberdeen Football Club and has been reporting on their matches since 1990.

Selected publications 

 Joe Harper and Charlie Allan, King Joey - Upfront and Personal (2008), Birliin Ltd

References

Scottish journalists
Living people
1958 births
Writers from Aberdeen
People from Aberdeen